Gortlownan Motte is a motte and National Monument located in County Sligo, Ireland.

Location
Gortlownan Motte is located 2.4 km (1½ miles) west-southwest of Dromahair, just on the Sligo side of the border.

History and archaeology
Motte-and-bailey castles were a primitive type of castle built after the Norman invasion, a mound of earth topped by a wooden palisade and tower.

The motte at Gortlownan may have been built on the site of an earlier Gaelic Irish hillfort.

References

Archaeological sites in County Sligo
National Monuments in County Sligo
Motte-and-bailey castles